Yijiang District is an urban district of the city of Wuhu, Anhui Province, China.

Administrative divisions
Yijiang District is divided to 7 subdistricts.
7 Subdistricts

References

Wuhu